Nürnberger Schnauzen is a German television series.

See also
List of German television series

External links
 

2008 German television series debuts
2009 German television series endings
Television series about animals
German-language television shows
ZDF original programming